Scribblings is a 1972 collection of writings by science fiction and fantasy author L. Sprague de Camp to celebrate his appearance as Guest of Honor at Boskone IX, a convention sponsored by the New England Science Fiction Association. The Association served as publisher.

The book contains short works of fiction, poetry, non-fiction, and aphorisms. Among the stories are the complete set of de Camp's four short "Drinkwhiskey Institute" series of tall tales.

Contents
"A Word of Explanation" (introduction)
Probability Zero
"The Effects of Time Travel" (story in the "Drinkwhiskey Institute" series)
"The Negative Wugug" (story in the "Drinkwhiskey Institute" series)
"The Moveable Ears" (story in the "Drinkwhiskey Institute" series)
"The Lusts of Professor Adams" (story in the "Drinkwhiskey Institute" series)
Jingles
"Preferences" (poem)
"Carnac" (poem)
"The Elephant" (poem)
"Leaves" (poem)
"The Trap" (poem)
"The Newt" (poem)
"African Night" (poem)
"A Night Club in Cairo" (poem)
"Xeroxing the Necromonicon" (poem)
It Might Interest You to Know
"How to Hunt Dinosaurs" (essay)
"Pfui on Psi" (essay on psychic powers)
"Lost Cities" (essay)
"Government Bug-Hunter" (essay on Clinton Hart Merriam)
"Three Thirds of a Hero" (poem)
"Books That Never Were" (essay on lost and imaginary books)
"Aphorisms" (aphorisms)

Notes

1972 short story collections
Science fiction short story collections by L. Sprague de Camp
American poetry collections
Essay collections
Poetry by L. Sprague de Camp
NESFA Press books